USS Conquest (AMc-71) was an Accentor-class coastal minesweeper acquired by the U.S. Navy for the dangerous task of removing mines from minefields laid in the water to prevent ships from passing.

World War II service 

Conquest was placed in service 9 March 1942 and served the 10th Naval District in the Caribbean during the war.

Post-war inactivation 

She was transferred to the Maritime Commission for disposal 9 August 1946.

References

External links 
 

 

Accentor-class minesweepers
World War II mine warfare vessels of the United States
1941 ships